The 1926–27 Washington State Cougars men's basketball team represented Washington State College for the  college basketball season. Led by first-year head coach Karl Schlademan, the Cougars were members of the Pacific Coast Conference and played their home games on campus in Pullman, Washington.

Previously at the University of Kansas, Schlademan was the track and field coach for the Cougars until 1940, but was head basketball coach for only two seasons. He took over from Fred Bohler, then was succeeded in 1928 by alumnus Jack Friel, who led Washington State as head coach for three decades.

References

External links
Sports Reference – Washington State Cougars: 1926–27 basketball season

Washington State Cougars men's basketball seasons
Washington State Cougars
Washington State
Washington State